Eugenia crassicaulis is a species of plant in the family Myrtaceae. It is endemic to Jamaica.  It is threatened by habitat loss.

References

crassicaulis
Endangered plants
Endemic flora of Jamaica
Taxonomy articles created by Polbot